Bernhard, Knight and Baron von Eskeles ( Ritter und Freiherr von Eskeles) (12 February 1753, Vienna – 7 August 1839, Hietzing (near Vienna, now Vienna)) was an Austrian-Jewish banker/financier and Court Jew.

He was born Bernhard Eskeles, the posthumous son of Rabbi Issachar Berush Eskeles, son of the Polish-Moravian Rabbi Gabriel Eskeles. At an early age he went to Amsterdam, where he entered a commercial house, of which he became manager at the age of 17, but met with reverses, and lost the fortune which his father had left to him.

In 1774 he returned to Vienna, married Caecilie (Zipperche) Itzig (1760–1836), a daughter of Daniel Itzig of Berlin, and joined in partnership and entered the business of his brother-in-law Nathan Arnstein, with whom he established the banking-house of Arnstein and Eskeles, which came into great prominence during the Congress of Vienna. They were patrons of Mozart and also of Ignaz Moscheles who gave piano lessons to Caecilie. At this period Eskeles's drawing-room was the rendezvous of men like Talleyrand, Wellington, Castlereagh, Hardenberg, and Theodor Körner. Eskeles's name is often mentioned in the memoirs of this time. His advice in financial matters was frequently sought by Emperors Joseph II, and later by Francis II and I, who entrusted him with many important missions to foreign countries. He was sent to Paris and Holland in 1810. Eskeles was the founder of the Austrian National Bank (1816), and its director for 23 years. He was raised to the Austrian nobility in 1797, and became a knight in 1811, and a baron in 1822.

Eskeles took little interest in Jewish affairs, and during his short term of office as representative of the Jewish community new and vexatious measures were introduced which, according to his contemporaries, he might have prevented had he used his influence. He was, however, the founder of several charitable institutions. He also established, with an initial contribution of 50,000 florins, a fund for the maintenance of poor students. His two children, a son, Denis, Baron de Eskeles (1803-1876), and a daughter, Maria Anna (Marianne) Cecilia Bernhardine Freiin von Eskeles, Countess of Wimpffen, wife of Franz Graf von Wimpffen, deserted Judaism. Denis, who succeeded his father in the management of the banking-house, married Wilhelmina, Baroness Brentano-Cimaroli, and by his death the male line of the house became extinct.

See also
Itzig family

References

 by Isidore Singer and Gotthard Deutsch

18th-century Austrian businesspeople
19th-century Austrian businesspeople
Austrian bankers
Jewish bankers
Barons of Austria
Austrian Ashkenazi Jews
Businesspeople from Vienna
People from Hietzing
1753 births
1839 deaths